Waldburg-Waldburg was a County ruled by the House of Waldburg, located in southeastern Baden-Württemberg, Germany. Waldburg-Waldburg was a partition of Waldburg-Wolfegg-Zeil and was divided between the other two parts of Waldburg-Wolfegg-Zeil — Waldburg-Wolfegg and Waldburg-Zeil — in 1660.

House of Waldburg